Străoane is a commune located in Vrancea County, Western Moldavia, Romania. It is composed of four villages: Muncelu, Repedea, Străoane, and Văleni.

Natives
 Gheorghe Alexianu (1897–1946), lawyer, governor of Transnistria between 1941 and 1944, convicted war criminal 
 Ion Ciocârlan (1874–1942), prose writer

References

Communes in Vrancea County
Localities in Western Moldavia